The Danish Medical Association (DADL) is a medical professional association in Denmark. It has a membership of 21,800, and is affiliated with the Danish Confederation of Professional Associations. Since 1954, it has published the medical journal Danish Medical Journal, which was originally named Danish Medical Bulletin until 2012.

History
The Danish Medical Association began in town of Korsør on the island of Zeeland, on September 1, 1857, after many informal meetings over the prior 6 years attended by many "provincial doctors" from around the nation. According to an article published in the British Medical Journal in 1957, " The D.M.A.'s present objects, as revised in 1935,
are (1) to unite Danish doctors in watching over the interests of the profession, and (2) to act as the organ by which the medical profession exerts its influence on problems affecting the community in general."

List of other organizations
Danish Medical Association is the main organization which has a number of physician associations / trade unions under its umbrella:
 Association of Junior Doctors
 General Practitioners Organization
 Association of Medical Specialists

References

External links
 Official site

 
Akademikerne – The Danish Confederation of Professional Associations